Joseph Francis Dinneen (1897–1964) was a crime reporter for The Boston Globe. He wrote several books and articles, many of which were adapted for film.

Books
 Yankee Fighter: The Story of an American in the Free French Foreign Legion (1943), co-authored with John F. "Jack" Hasey
The Purple Shamrock (1949), a biography of James Michael Curley
Underworld U.S.A (1956), the story of a growth of a criminal empire
Ward Eight (1936) 
The Anatomy of a Crime (1954), early book on Great Brink's robbery
The Great Brinks Holdup (1961), co-authored with Sid Feder

Films
Six Bridges to Cross (story "They Stole $25,000,000 - And Got Away with It") 
Let Us Live (story "Murder in Massachusetts")
Underworld U.S.A.

References

1897 births
1964 deaths
20th-century American biographers
American male biographers
20th-century American historians
American male non-fiction writers
20th-century American male writers